OxygenOS is an Android-based operating system (OS) developed by Chinese smartphone manufacturer OnePlus exclusively for their smartphones. OxygenOS was developed for their overseas market. There used to also be another version of the OS designed specifically for the Chinese market called HydrogenOS.

In an interview published on 3 September 2016, XDA Developers revealed OnePlus was "actively merging both platforms (OxygenOS and HydrogenOS) into a single cohesive operating system based on Android".

Features

Version 1.0 was based on Android 5.0.1 and was available only for the OnePlus One via a flashable ZIP provided through the OnePlus website.

Notable features of version 2.0 and 2.1.1 include app permissions, Waves MaxxAudio, SwiftKey keyboard, off-screen gestures, custom icons, dark mode, manual camera mode, and RAW support for 3rd party apps, like Camera FV-5 2.75.

On 31 December 2016, OnePlus released OxygenOS 4.0.0 based on Android Nougat and includes its features and several other modifications to the public via OTA download.

On 31 January 2018, OnePlus released OxygenOS 5.0.3 based on Android Oreo to the public via OTA download. In May 2018, OnePlus launched OnePlus 6 with OxygenOS based on Android Oreo 8.1.

On 29 October 2018, OnePlus launched OnePlus 6T with OxygenOS 9.0 based on Android Pie.

On 25 December 2018, OnePlus released OxygenOS 9.0.0 based on Android Pie for OnePlus 5/5T to the public via OTA download.

On 21 September 2019, OnePlus announced the release of OxygenOS version 10.0 based on Android 10 for OnePlus 7 and 7 Pro. This initial release was followed by Android 10 based builds for older devices later.

On 06 August 2022, OnePlus announced OxygenOS 13 which is based on Android 13. OxygenOS 13 is eligible for OnePlus 10 series to OnePlus 8 series smartphones and some Nord smartphones.

Privacy 
OnePlus released a statement about data collection and analytics, claiming that the data is only used for system improvement and optimization, are not shared with third parties, and can be disabled by users in the system settings. OnePlus also says that they are revising the data analysis mechanism, and will no longer collect certain data.

Devices running on OxygenOS

History 

In July 2021, OnePlus merged OxygenOS with Oppo’s ColorOS. Both companies’ software will remain separate and continue to serve their individual regions (OxygenOS for OnePlus phones globally, ColorOS on OnePlus and Oppo devices in China) but share a common codebase, which OnePlus says should standardize its software experience and streamline the development process for future OxygenOS updates.

References

External links
 

Android (operating system)
OnePlus